The 11th Chess Olympiad, organized by the FIDE and comprising an open team tournament, as well as several other events designed to promote the game of chess, took place between September 4 and September 25, 1954, in Amsterdam, Netherlands.

30 teams had applied, but only 26 took part. The most notable absentees were the United States, who couldn't afford the travelling expenses due to financial difficulties in the USCF.

The Soviet team once again won the event, followed by Argentina and Yugoslavia. Unlike the previous Olympiad, however, they dominated this one completely and crushed all opposition, winning the final by an astounding seven points. Keres' amazing score of 96.4% was an all-time record; he drew his first game (against Nilsson of Sweden) and won the rest.

Results

Preliminaries

A total of 26 teams entered the competition and were divided into four preliminary groups of six or seven teams. The top three from each group advanced to Final A, and the rest to Final B. All groups and finals were played as round-robin tournaments.

Group 1 was won by the Soviet Union, well ahead of the Dutch hosts and Iceland. Austria, Finland, and Greece finished in the bottom half.

Argentina took first place in group 2, ahead of Bulgaria and Czechoslovakia. Canada, Italy, and Ireland made up the rest of the group.

Group 3 was won by Israel, ahead of Yugoslavia and Sweden. Denmark, Norway, France, and Saar had to settle for a place in the consolation final.

Hungary clinched group 4, ahead of West Germany and England. Switzerland, Colombia, Belgium, and Luxembourg rounded up the group.

Group 1

Group 2 

Group 3

Group 4

Final

{| class="wikitable"
|+ Final A
! # !!Country !! Players !! Points !! MP
|-
| style="background:gold;"|1 ||  || Botvinnik, Smyslov, Bronstein, Keres, Geller, Kotov || 34 || 
|-
| style="background:silver;"|2 ||  || Najdorf, J. Bolbochán, Panno, Guimard, Rossetto, Pilnik || 27 || 
|-
| style="background:#cc9966;"|3 ||  || Pirc, Gligorić, Trifunović, Rabar, Fuderer, Matanović || 26½ || 
|-
| 4 ||  || Pachman, Filip, Zíta, Šajtar, Fichtl, Ujtelky || 24½ || 
|-
| 5 ||  || Unzicker, Schmid, Pfeiffer, Rellstab, Darga, Joppen || 23½ || 
|-
| 6 ||  || Szabó, Kluger, Barcza, Sándor, Gereben || 23 || 
|-
| 7 ||  || Porath, Czerniak, Oren, Aloni, Kniazer || 22 || 
|-
| 8 ||  || Euwe, Donner, Cortlever, Prins, Kramer, Van Scheltinga || 21 || 
|-
| 9 ||  || Alexander, Penrose, Golombek, Wade, Barden, Clarke || 17 || 7
|-
| 10 ||  || Minev, Neikirch, Milev, Tsvetkov, Bobotsov, Bobekov || 17 || 6
|-
| 11 ||  || Ståhlberg, Lundin, Stoltz, Hörberg, Nilsson, Goode || 15 || 
|-
| 12 ||  || Friðrik Ólafsson, Guðmundur Guðmundsson, Guðmundur Pálmason,Guðmundur Ágústsson, Ingi Randver Jóhannsson, Guðmundur Arnlaugsson || 13½ || 
|-
|}

{| class="wikitable"
|+ Final B
! # !!Country !! Players !! Points !! MP !! Head-to-head
|-
| 13 ||  || Kupper, Blau, Nievergelt, Bhend, Zimmermann, Walther || 37 ||  || 
|-
| 14 ||  || Yanofsky, Anderson, Vaitonis, Bohatyrchuk, Fox, Divinsky || 36 || 21 || 3
|-
| 15 ||  || Robatsch, Beni, Prameshuber, Lokvenc, Kovács || 36 || 21 || 1
|-
| 16 ||  || Larsen, Nielsen A., Nielsen P., Nielsen V., Enevoldsen, Andersen B. || 34½ ||  || 
|-
| 17 ||  || Paoli, Porreca, Norcia, Scafarelli, Calà || 28½ ||  || 
|-
| 18 ||  || Cuéllar, de Greiff, Sánchez, Rivera, Tejada H., Hernández G. || 27½ ||  || 
|-
| 19 ||  || O'Kelly, Dunkelblum, Gobert, Lemaire, Franck, Thibaut || 27 ||  || 
|-
| 20 ||  || Salo, Vesterinen, Katajisto, Fred, Rantanen || 26½ ||  || 
|-
| 21 ||  || Bernstein, Raizman, Thiellement, Bergraser, Noradounguian, Burstein || 26 ||  || 
|-
| 22 ||  || Benkner, Lorson, Morena, Kastel, Weichselbaumer, Haas || 24 ||  || 
|-
| 23 ||  || Morcken, Vestøl, Lindblom, Støre, Flater, Ramm || 22 || || 
|-
| 24 ||  || Parliaros, Anagnostou, Panagopoulos, Papapavlou || 21 ||  || 
|-
| 25 ||  || Reilly, Kelly, Maher, Walsh, Nash, Rohan || 11 ||  || 
|-
| 26 ||  || Doerner, Neu, Philippe, Schneider, Kremer, Jerolim J. || 7 ||  || 
|}

Final A

Final B

Individual medals

 Board 1:  Mikhail Botvinnik 8½ / 11 = 77.3%
 Board 2:  Frank Anderson 14 / 17 = 82.4%
 Board 3:  Gedeon Barcza 12½ / 16 = 78.1%
 Board 4:  Paul Keres 13½ / 14 = 96.4%
 1st reserve:  Efim Geller 5 / 7 = 71.4%
 2nd reserve:  Sylvain Burstein 8½ / 11 = 77.3%

Notes and references

External links

11th Chess Olympiad: Amsterdam 1954 OlimpBase

11
Olympiad 11
Chess Olympiad, 11th
Olympiad 11
Chess Olympiad 11
September 1954 sports events in Europe
1950s in Amsterdam